Lamnay is a commune in the Sarthe department, region of Pays de la Loire, northwestern France.

See also
Communes of the Sarthe department

References

Communes of Sarthe